Panorama Tools (also known as PanoTools) are a suite of programs and libraries for image stitching, i.e., re-projecting and blending multiple source images into immersive panoramas of many types. It was originally written by German physics and mathematics professor Helmut Dersch. Panorama Tools provides a framework An updated version of the Panorama Tools library serves as the underlying core engine for many software panorama graphical user interface front ends.

History
Dersch started development on Panorama Tools in 1998, producing software available for creating panoramas and more, but had to stop development in 2001 due to legal harassment and claims of patent infringement by the company IPIX. Dersch released the core library (pano12) and some of the programs of Panorama Tools under the terms of the GNU General Public License. The rest of the applications were made available as binary executables only and for free without a copyleft license.

The development of the source code of Panorama Tools was continued by some members of the original Panorama Tools mailing list. In December 2003 they initiated a free software project which is currently hosted by SourceForge. SourceForge requires that all hosted software is released under an open source license. For this reason Dersch's unlicensed binaries are not hosted there, although they can still be found on mirror websites.

On 5 August 2007, Dersch announced his intention to relicense the Panorama Tools source code. On 9 August 2007, Dersch changed the license to a GNU Lesser General Public License.

Sub-components

Original release
PanoTools consists of the following components:

PTEditor Java interactive panorama editor.
PTPicker Java front end to panorama stitcher and other tools. It provides a graphical interface for feature point selection and position optimization.
PTCrypt Java tool for scrambling pictures intended to be viewed on-line with PTViewer.
PTStitcher Panorama stitching tool which remaps, adjusts and combines arbitrary images to panoramic views.
PTOptimizer† Optimizes positions and sizes of images using control-point data.
PTStereo Creates 3-dimensional objects from 2 or more stereoscopic images.
PTInterpolate Physically valid true view interpolator. Given two images of the same scene taken from different positions, this tool creates views from any intermediate position.
PTMorpher Morphing tool.
PTAverage Averages images to reduce noise and enhance density.
PTStripe Combines images into movie-stripes for viewing in object-viewers (PTMovie extension to PTViewer).
PanoTools PluginsPhotoshop, GraphicConverter and GIMP plug-ins for image correction and remapping. Also compatible to many other programs that can use Photoshop plug-ins.
pano12 library† The underlying panorama library, currently used by several different panorama front-ends and command line programs.
pano13 library† Current version of the library. No longer compatible with programs for which no source code is available.
†Open source.

Further developments

In 2006 the functionality of PTstitcher was reproduced by the developers of Panorama Tools. Its functionality was broken into several program, in an attempt to modularize it:

PTmender† Remaps one image at a time
PTblender† Implements the rudimentary colour correction algorithm found in later versions of PTstitcher
PTmasker† Computes stitching masks. It implements the ability to increase depth-of-field by stacking images
PTroller† Takes a set of images and merges them into a single one
PTcrop† Crops an image to its outer rectangle.
PTuncrop† Opposite of PTcrop: takes a cropped file and creates an uncropped one.
PTtiff2psd† Takes a series of input images and creates a Photoshop PSD file where each input file is a layer.
†Open source.

Front-ends and applications
To make working with Panorama Tools easier and to add functionality, many interactive, graphical front-ends to Panorama Tools have been developed, both open source (e.g. Hugin) and commercial (e.g. PTgui and PTMac), along with a variety of other companion applications (e.g. smartblend and ), which in many cases make interacting directly with the programs in the original Panorama Tools toolset unnecessary.

Further reading
The software Panorama Tools is mentioned and covered in several books, e.g.
 Jacobs, Corinna - Interactive Panoramas: Techniques for Digital Panoramic Photography 
 Andrews, Philip - 360 Degree Imaging: The Photographer's Panoramic Virtual Reality Manual 
 Gulbins, Jürgen & Steinmüller, Uwe - Art of RAW Conversion: How to Produce Art-Quality Photos with Adobe Photoshop CS2 and Leading RAW Converters

References

External links
 
 Helmut Dersch author's current site.
 Helmut Dersch old page author's site last state before it was taken offline in 2001.
 PanoTools.org primary community page recommended by the SourceForge project

Free graphics software
Free software programmed in C
Free photo stitching software
Photo software for Linux